This article details the qualifying phase for weightlifting at the 2016 Summer Olympics.  The competition at these Games includes 260 athletes. Each competing nation is allowed to enter a maximum of 10 competitors, 6 men and 4 women. 2014 and 2015 World Weightlifting Championships are the main qualifying events for the 2016 Olympic games. NOCs achieve qualification places according to their position in the joint team classification by points adding those scored in the 2014 and 2015 World Championships. One continental qualification event is held for each continent in 2016. Only NOCs which have not gained quota places in the Main Qualification Events may obtain quota places.

On November 19, 2015, the International Weightlifting Federation banned Bulgaria from competing at the Rio Olympics due to doping, and took one Olympic entry place from Romania and Uzbekistan because of "multiple positive cases" of doping.

On 22 June 2016, the International Weightlifting Federation announced that a number of countries would lose quota places in weightlifting at the Games because of doping violations. IWF then went on to state that if the testing of 'B' samples confirmed any country had three or more violations in the 2008 and 2012 Olympic retesting programme, that country would be suspended from international weightlifting for one year, and would thereby be excluded from the Games in Rio, alongside the already suspended Bulgaria.

IWF clarified that after retesting of 'A' samples from 2008 and 2012 that the three countries therefore scheduled for suspension were Kazakhstan, Russia and Belarus. Russia is appealing this decision also to the Court of Arbitration for Sport on 6 July 2016. In addition, quota places have been removed from Azerbaijan (2), Belarus (1), Kazakhstan (1), Moldova (2), North Korea (2), Russia (2), Romania (1) and Uzbekistan (1).

Summary 

* The International Olympic Committee and the International Weightlifting Federation (IWF) have decided to remove one quota place from Romania (men) and Uzbekistan (women) due to "multiple positive cases" of doping.
** On June 22, 2016, IWF further removed 11 quotas from 6 NOCs:
  loses 1 man and 1 woman quota.
  loses 1 man quota.
  loses 2 men quota.
*** On July 29, 2016, the IWF banned the entire Russian team (which had quota for eight athletes; five men and three women). The IWF then reallocated the quota as follows:

Timeline 

Individual ranking events

Men 
Note: In the 2015 Qualification ranking, the IWF deleted Bulgaria (BUL) from the ranking list and recalculated all scores accordingly (i.e. as if Bulgarian athletes had not competed). If the same changes are made to the 2014 ranking, point scores were changed and ranking places were altered.

World Championships 
 Teams 1st–6th: 6 athletes
 Teams 7th–12th: 5 athletes
 Teams 13th–18th: 4 athletes
 Teams 19th–24th: 3 athletes

European Championships 
 Teams 1st–7th: 1 athlete

Asian Championships 
 Teams 1st–7th: 1 athlete

African Championships 
 Teams 1st–5th: 1 athlete

Oceania Championships 
 Teams 1st–5th: 1 athlete

Pan American Championships 
 Teams 1st–7th: 1 athlete

Women 
In the 2015 Qualification ranking, the IWF eliminated Bulgaria (BUL) from the ranking list and recalculated all scores accordingly, as if Bulgarian athletes had not been present at all. If the same changes are made to the 2014 ranking, point scores will change and ranking places may be altered.

World Championships 
 Teams 1st–9th: 4 athletes
 Teams 10th–16th: 3 athletes
 Teams 17th–21st: 2 athletes

European Championships 
 Teams 1st–6th: 1 athlete

Asian Championships 
 Teams 1st–6th: 1 athlete

African Championships 
 Teams 1st–4th: 1 athlete

Oceania Championships 
 Teams 1st–4th: 1 athlete

Pan American Championships 
 Teams 1st–4th: 1 athlete

Notes
 Nastassia Novikava's 4th-place finish in the 58 kg discipline during the 2015 IWF World Championships was invalidated due to a positive doping test.

Individual qualification
Eight places for men and seven places for women are allocated based on the Olympic Qualification Ranking Lists. Individual quota places are allocated to the athletes, ranked in the top 15 places for men and the top 10 places for women in each bodyweight category, from NOCs which have not gained any quota place(s) through the Main or Continental Qualification Events.

Men

Standings after Pan American Championships

Women

Standings after Pan American Championships

Notes:
 : Azerbaijan was stripped of a quota for men and women; as the country does not have any quota for either gender as an NOC, no athlete is eligible for the Games.

Tripartite commission invitations

Men

Women

Reallocation of unused quota places 
On June 23, 2016, the International Weightlifting Federation announced the re-allocation of 20 unused quota places. On July 29, 2016, the IWF announced more re-allocation of unused quota places.

Men

Women

References

External links
IWF Rio 2016 Olympic Coverage

Qualification for the 2016 Summer Olympics
Qualification